Yuriy Vasilevich Shatunov (September 6, 1973 – June 23, 2022) was a Russian singer, best known as being the frontman of the Russian 1980's band Laskoviy Mai (Ласковый май).

Name
Although his name is commonly spelled "Yuri Shatunov" in English, his official website, Shatunov.com, lists his name as "Yuriy" (which is the most precise transliteration of Russian), "Yury," and "Yuri." The English pronunciation of all three is identical. Yuri took his mother, Vera Shatunova's, surname at a young age due to the lack of a relationship with his father, Vasiliy Klimenko.

Personal life
Shatunov was born on 6 September 1973 in the city of Kumertau, Bashkir ASSR, Russian Soviet Federative Socialist Republic of the former Soviet Union. His father, Vasiliy Vladimirovich Klimenko, was half Russian and half Ukrainian. At the age of three he was abandoned by his father and was subsequently raised by his mother. When he was eleven, his mother died of heart disease. He went to live with his aunt and maternal grandparents, who soon found themselves unable to cope with his behavior.

Shatunov was sent to Orenburg Children's Home Number 2 in Orenburg, where he had a reputation for poor behavior. This included running away from the orphanage, playing guitar, singing on the streets to get money and cigarettes, getting into fights, and avoiding work.

He met with Sergei Kuznetsov, a music teacher in the orphanage, and they created a band, "Laskoviy Mai" ("Tender May"). One of the most common themes the young band members would sing about was unfortunate love. This was uncommon at the time, and atypical considering the age of the two, both young teenagers. This group, in which Shatunov was the frontman, existed from 1986 to 1992, and was very popular in Russia. In 1996, Shatunov moved to Germany, where he went to complete his education, left unfinished as a result of his turbulent youth and early career in music. Whilst in Germany, Shatunov learned how to become a music producer.

Shatunov had a wife, a son, and a daughter. Shatunov and his wife got married in 2007 in Germany, after seven years of dating.

Before Shatunov died, he was busy working on his solo career, and performed frequently in Russia, Germany and in Eastern European countries, as well as some of the former Soviet bloc countries in Central Asia such as Kazakhstan and Kyrgyzstan.

Yuri Shatunov died on the night of 23 June 2022 of acute heart failure (myocardial infarction) in a Moscow hospital. The singer's condition deteriorated critically on the way to a hospital in Domodedovo where he underwent intensive resuscitation but could not be saved. Funeral ceremonies for Yuri Shatunov were held on 26 June 2022 in the farewell hall of Moscow's Troyekurovskoye Cemetery, and he was cremated a day later. On 28 June 2022, the urn containing his ashes was partially buried in Moscow's Troyekurovskoye Cemetery and the other part of the ashes, in accordance with the singer's wishes, will be scattered into one of the lakes in Munich, Germany.

Rights to songs and performances 
In 1992, the songwriter Sergey Kuznetsov signed a contract with Andrey Razin, and 14 years later they made a deal, based on which the producer became the sole owner of the group's hits. However, during the trial it turned out that "no one has ever seen the original contract." Moreover, the examination proved that Kuznetsov's signature was forged, which means that the transaction was falsified. On June 17, 2022, it became known that Shatunov had sued for the rights to the compositions of the group "Tender May".

On June 20, the singer gave the last TV interview in his life, in which he commented on the trial with Razin.

Discography

Studio albums
Do You Remember... (1994)
Remember May (2001)
Gray Night (2002)
If You Want... Don't Be Afraid (2004)
Record My Voice (2006)
I Believe... (2012)
Don't Be Silent... (2018)

Singles

Belye rozy – The White Roses: 1986 demo, 1988, 1996 remix, 2003 remix, 2004, 2005, 2019
Zabud – Forget: 2001, 2002 remix, 2004, 2019
Tet-a-tet – One-in-one: 2011, 2019
A leto cveta – The summer colors: 2012, 2018
Detstvo – Childhood: 1992, 2002, 2005, 2019
Sedaya noch – Grizzled night: 1986 demo, 1988, 1996 remix, 2001, 2019
Ne boisya – Do not be afraid: 2003, 2005, 2018
Rozovyi vecher – Pink evening: 1988, 1996 remix, 2003 remix, 2005, 2019
Gryozy – Dreams: 2014, 2018
Leto – Summer: 1986 demo, 1988, 1996 remix, 2001 remix, 2004
Vecher holodnoyi zimy – Cold winter evening: 1986 demo, 2002, 2019
Ryadom s nei – Next to her: 2014, 2018
Chto zh ty, leto – What are you, summer: 2002, 2019
Nu chto zhe ty – Well, what are you: 1986 demo, 1988, 1996 remix, 2004
Zvyozdnaya noch – Starry night: 1992, 2018
Poezda – Trains: 2014
Pust budet noch – Let it be the night: 1986 demo, 1988, 2004
Glupye snezhinki – Silly snowflakes: 1988, 2011
Zhizn moya – My life: 2014, 2018
Zapishi moi golos na kassettu – Record my voice on tape: 2005, 2018
Medlenno uhodit osen – Slowly autumn leaves: 1986 demo, 1988, 2002, 2005, 2019
Odnoklassniki – Classmates: 2015, 2018
Maiskii vecher – May evening: 2008, 2012
Zvezda – Stars: 2015, 2018

Padayut listya – Fall leaves: 2001, 2002 remix, 2005
Ot belyh roz – From the white roses: 2011
Tayuschii sneg – Melting snow: 1986 demo, 1988, 1996 remix, 2005
I ya pod kitaru – And I play guitar: 2015, 2017
Ty prosto byl : You've just been: 1988
Ya otkrovenen – I'm frankly: 1986 demo, 1988, 1996 remix, 2004
Posle vypusknogo – After the graduation: 2005
Ne molchi – Do not be silent: 2018
Privet – Hi: 2012
Esli hochesh – If you want to: 2004
Ya teryayu – I'm losing: 2001, 2002 remix
S dnjom rozhdenija: Happy birthday – 2017
I upav na koleni – And having fallen on his knees: 1993
Ya veryu – I believe: 2012
Ty prosti menya, prosti – Forgive me, forgive: 2005
V pozhdestvo – (On) The Christmas: 2018 
Bez tebya – Without you: 2012
Skolko mozhno – How much: 2005
A pomnish – The remember: 1999, 2005, 2019
A ty vosmi i pozvoni – And you take it and call: 2018
Ya peressorilsya v dozhdyom – I quarreled in the rain: 2001
Ne hochu – I do not want: 2012, 2019
Mama – Mum: 1993
Ty mne ne verish – You do not believe me: 2018
Romashki – Daisies: 2012, 2019
Pismo – Letter: 1993, 2019 remix

References

External links

 Yuriy Shatunov reveals secret of his family Russian News (6 September)
 "Ласковый май", popsa.info. 
 Shatunov.com, official site
 
 

1973 births
2022 deaths
People from Bashkortostan
Soviet pop singers
Soviet male singers
Russian songwriters
21st-century Russian singers
20th-century Russian male singers
20th-century Russian singers
21st-century Russian male singers
Burials in Troyekurovskoye Cemetery